The Olney interpretation (also known as the Olney corollary or Olney declaration) was United States Secretary of State Richard Olney's interpretation of the Monroe Doctrine. During a border dispute between British Guiana and Venezuela, Olney claimed in 1895 that the Monroe Doctrine gave the United States authority to mediate border disputes in the Western Hemisphere. He extended the meaning of the Monroe Doctrine, which had previously stated merely that the Western Hemisphere was closed to additional European colonization: "Today the United States is practically sovereign on this continent and its fiat is law upon the subjects to which it confines its interposition... 

The border dispute was settled by arbitration in 1897, and the Olney interpretation was defunct by 1933.

References

Sources
 George B. Young, "Intervention Under the Monroe Doctrine: The Olney Corollary," Political Science Quarterly, Vol. 57, No. 2 (Jun., 1942), pp. 247–280 in JSTOR

Legal history of the United States
History of the foreign relations of the United States
Spanish–American War
Banana Wars
1895 in the United States
Guyana–Venezuela border
Foreign relations of the United States
Monroe Doctrine